The Amami Communist Party was an underground political party on the Amami Islands. Founded during the American military occupation of the islands, it had a leading role in the movement for the reversion of Amami to Japan although at the final stage, it was purged from the movement. It was not entirely in sync with the Japanese Communist Party on this issue. The American military government (later the United States Civil Administration of the Ryukyu Islands) banned the party and raided their headquarters and several of their members' houses on 27 March 1950. The next day, 17 members of the party's leadership were arrested for "planning a riot" and subversion of the military government.

References 

1947 establishments in Japan
Communist parties in Japan
Defunct communist parties
Defunct political parties in Japan
History of Kagoshima Prefecture
Politics of Kagoshima Prefecture
Political parties established in 1947
Political parties with year of disestablishment missing